Niger competed at the 2016 Summer Olympics in Rio de Janeiro, Brazil, from 5 to 21 August 2016. Since the nation made its debut in 1964, Nigerien athletes had participated in every edition of the Summer Olympic Games, except for two rare occasions, the 1976 Summer Olympics in Montreal, and the 1980 Summer Olympics in Moscow because of the African and the US-led boycotts, respectively.

Nigerien Olympic and National Sports Committee sent a team of six athletes, four men and two women, to compete in four different sports at the Olympics, matching the nation's roster size with London 2012. This was also the youngest delegation in Niger's Olympic history, with about half the team under the age of 25, and many of the team members were expected to reach their peak in time for the 2020 Summer Olympics in Tokyo. All of the Nigerien athletes made their Olympic debut in Rio de Janeiro, with six-foot-nine taekwondo fighter Abdoul Razak Issoufou leading the team as the nation's flag bearer in the opening ceremony.

Niger left Rio de Janeiro with its first ever Olympic medal of any color since the 1972 Summer Olympics in Munich. It was awarded to Issoufou in the men's heavyweight category (+80 kg).

Medalists

Athletics

Niger has received universality slots from IAAF to send two athletes (one male and one female) to the Olympics.

Track & road events

Judo

Niger has qualified one judoka for the men's lightweight category (73 kg) at the Games. Ahmed Goumar earned a continental quota spot from the African region as Niger's top-ranked judoka outside of direct qualifying position in the IJF World Ranking List of May 30, 2016.

Swimming

Niger has received a Universality invitation from FINA to send two swimmers (one male and one female) to the Olympics.

Taekwondo
 
Niger entered one athlete into the taekwondo competition at the Olympics. Abdoul Razak Issoufou secured a spot in the men's heavyweight category (+80 kg) by virtue of his top two finish at the 2016 African Qualification Tournament in Agadir, Morocco.

References

External links 

 

Nations at the 2016 Summer Olympics
2016
Olympics